Events from the year 1841 in France.

Incumbents
 Monarch – Louis Philippe I

Events

Births
7 January - Bernadette Soubirous, reported apparitions at Lourdes (died 1879)
14 January - Berthe Morisot, painter (died 1895)
18 January - Emmanuel Chabrier, composer (died 1894)
30 January - Félix Faure, President of France (died 1899)
25 February - Pierre-Auguste Renoir, painter (died 1919)
2 April - Clément Ader, engineer and aviation pioneer (died 1925)
13 April - Louis-Ernest Barrias, sculptor (died 1905)
28 September - Georges Clemenceau, statesman, physician, journalist and Prime Minister (died 1929)
6 November - Armand Fallières, politician and President of France (died 1931)
6 December - Frédéric Bazille, painter (died 1870)
20 December - Ferdinand Buisson, academic. pacifist, politician, awarded Nobel Peace Prize in 1927 (died 1932)

Full date unknown
Marie Bracquemond, artist (died 1916)
Charles Jean Baptiste Collin-Mezin, maker of violins, violas, cellos, basses and bows (died 1923)

Deaths
13 January - Bertrand Barère de Vieuzac, politician and journalist (born 1755)
23 February - Louis Nicolas Philippe Auguste de Forbin, painter and antiquary (born 1779)
1 March - Claude Victor-Perrin, Duc de Belluno, Marshal of France (born 1764)
28 April - Peter Chanel, priest, missionary, martyr and saint (born 1803)
23 June - Étienne Joseph Louis Garnier-Pagès, politician (born 1801)
9 November - Jean Victoire Audouin, naturalist, entomologist and ornithologist (born 1797)

Full date unknown
Nicolas Appert, confectioner, inventor of airtight food preservation (born 1749)
Louis Pierre Edouard, Baron Bignon, diplomat and historian (born 1771)
Alexandre-Hyacinthe Dunouy, painter (born 1757)
Etienne Félix d'Henin de Cuvillers, practitioner of mesmerism as a scientific discipline (born 1755)
François-Honoré-Georges Jacob-Desmalter, furniture maker (born 1770)

References

1840s in France